Toshiyuki Hamaguchi (kanji: 浜口俊之, born June 4, 1970) is a Japanese motorcycle racer who has won the 600cc Supersports class of the FIM Asian Grand Prix Championship six times: in 2002, 2003, 2004, 2005, 2006, and 2008.

References
 Official blog

1970 births
Living people
Japanese motorcycle racers
Place of birth missing (living people)
21st-century Japanese people